Paul Richards (November 23, 1924 – December 10, 1974) was an American actor who appeared in films and on television in the 1950s, 1960s, and 1970s.

Early years
A native of Hollywood, Richards earned a psychology degree at University of California, Los Angeles and a master's degree in drama, also from UCLA. He gained additional acting experience at the Theatre Wing in New York.

Career
He guest-starred in television western series such as The Rifleman, Have Gun–Will Travel,
[Highway Patrol (1956),  Zorro, Johnny Ringo, The Rebel, Zane Grey Theatre, Black Saddle, Gunsmoke, Bonanza, The Untouchables,Trackdown, Rawhide, The Virginian, The Loner, and The Guns of Will Sonnett. Richards performed four times on Gunsmoke. In 1955, in the series' first episode, "Matt Gets It", he portrays a near-sighted gunfighter who outdraws and nearly kills Matt Dillon. The next year, in "Mr. and Mrs. Amber", he portrayed a poor, desperate homesteader beleaguered by his rich, self-righteous brother-in-law. His other two appearances on Gunsmoke were in 1958 and 1968 episodes.

Richards guest-starred three times in 1956 on Frontier, as Louis Rose in "The Texicans", John Webb in "The Big Dry", and Will Shaw in "The Salt War". He guest-starred in Crusader, a Cold War drama. Richards appeared twice on the Western series Tombstone Territory in the episodes "Thicker than Water" (1958) and "The Noose That Broke" (1959). Richards was cast as Bret Younger in the episode "The Desperado" (1957) on the Western series Broken Arrow.

He also appeared in the syndicated series Sheriff of Cochise and The Silent Service. He was a guest star on Kenneth Tobey's Whirlybirds, a syndicated aviation adventure series. He appeared on  The Brothers Brannagan, with Stephen Dunne and Mark Roberts. He made guest appearances on Straightaway and on Dragnet. In the 1955 episode "The Big Bird," Richards played Phil Baurch, who stole from people's homes after being hired out to do yard work.

In 1959, he appeared in a five-part episode "Louie K" in the role of Louis "Louie" Kassoff in The Lawless Years with James Gregory. In the March 3, 1961 episode “An Absence of Tears” on the popular TV show “Route 66”, he did a turn as a mob connected bad boy and ex-love to a blind girl looking for revenge against mobsters who murdered her Honeymoon Husband. “He also appeared in Dan Raven, a crime drama, and the anthology series The Lloyd Bridges Show in the 1962 episode "Testing Ground". On Perry Mason, in 1959, he played murderer Earl Mauldin in "The Case of the Startled Stallion", then played defendant Ted Chase in the 1962 episode "The Case of the Melancholy Marksman" (in 1973 Richards played Jules Barron in The New Perry Mason episode "The Case of the Cagey Cager"). In summer 1960, he appeared on Tate. In 1962, he portrayed Vance Caldwell in "The Boss's Daughters" on Rawhide. Also in 1962, he played the part of Dr. Max Richter on the Death Valley Days episode "Bloodline".

He starred as Dr. McKinley Thompson in the 1963-1964 medical drama Breaking Point. He appeared in the 1964 episode "Murder by Scandal" of the drama The Reporter. He appeared in a 1964 episode of The Fugitive titled "A.P.B.".  He later appeared as a villainous lawyer in a 1968 episode of Hawaii Five-O, titled "Twenty-four Karat Kill".

Richards guest-starred in 1960s and 1970s television series, including Burke's Law, I Spy, Mannix, Banacek, McMillan and Wife, and three appearances on The Mod Squad between 1969 and 1972. Richards appeared primarily in dramas, but made turns into comedy, as well, appearing in "The Town Tamer" episode of Tim Conway's 1967 western sitcom Rango, and in a 1969 episode of Get Smart as a villain named Ironhands.

He appeared as the mutant leader Mendez in the 1970 science-fiction film Beneath the Planet of the Apes. One of his minor film roles was a prisoner in Demetrius and the Gladiators, a sequel to 20th Century Fox's biblical epic The Robe.

For several years, Richards served as the commercial pitchman for General Motors' Pontiac Division, doing commercials for several of its cars, including the GTO and Firebird. He was a commercial spokesman for Braniff Airways in 1965 and starred in the Airline's historic End of the Plain Plane television commercial. In the early 1970s, he was a commercial spokesman for American Express.

Personal life
In 1953, Richards married actress Monica Keating.

Death
Richards  died from cancer at the age of 50, and was entombed in Hillside Memorial Park Cemetery.

Partial filmography

Fixed Bayonets! (1951) - Ramirez (uncredited)
War Paint (1953) - Trooper Perkins
Hell and High Water (1954) - Prisoner (uncredited)
Phantom of the Rue Morgue (1954) - Rene the Knife-thrower
Playgirl (1954) - Wilbur
Demetrius and the Gladiators (1954) - Prisoner (uncredited)
Pushover (1954) - Harry Wheeler (uncredited)
The Silver Chalice (1954) - Tigellinus (uncredited)
Kiss Me Deadly (1955) - Attacker
Tall Man Riding (1955) - The Peso Kid
The Houston Story (1956) - Gordon Shay
Tension at Table Rock (1956) - Sam Murdock
Scandal Incorporated (1956) - Martin Ellis
The Black Whip (1956) - John Murdock
Hot Summer Night (1957) - Elly Horn
Monkey on My Back (1957) - Rico
The Unknown Terror (1957) - Peter Morgan
Blood Arrow (1958) - Brill
Four Fast Guns (1960) - Hoag
All the Young Men (1960) - Pvt. Bracken
Savage Justice (1967) - Rob MacRoy
The St. Valentine's Day Massacre (1967) - Charles Fischetti
Beneath the Planet of the Apes (1970) - Mendez
Triangle (1970) - Dr. Victor Enfield
I Escaped from Devil's Island (1973) - Maj. Marteau

References

Further reading
 Les Wedman: "The Glass Eye," The Vancouver Sun (Monday, May 28, 1962), p. 24
 "ABC's 'Breaking Point': Paul Richards - 'Actor's Actor' Discusses His Profession," The Meriden Journal (Saturday, March 21, 1964), p. 1-A
 "TV Psychiatrist Taking a Break," The Milwaukee Journal (Tuesday, April 21, 1964), Part 2, p. 8
 Hal Humphrey: "Acting in the Ads: Richards Makes His way Commercially," The Fredericksburg Free Lance-Star (Friday, March 1, 1968), p. 14-A

External links

 
 Paul Richards - Special Guest Star
 

1924 births
1974 deaths
Male actors from California
American male film actors
American male radio actors
American male television actors
Jewish American male actors
People from Greater Los Angeles
Deaths from cancer in California
Burials at Hillside Memorial Park Cemetery
20th-century American male actors
Western (genre) television actors
Male Western (genre) film actors
20th-century American Jews